Peter Schiefke  (born April 13, 1979) is a Canadian environmentalist and Liberal politician, who was elected to represent the riding of Vaudreuil—Soulanges in the House of Commons of Canada in the 2015 federal election.

Biography 
Peter Schiefke spent his early childhood in Hudson, Quebec and subsequently moved onto the island of Montreal where he attended and graduated from Rosemount High School. He holds a Bachelor of Arts in Political Science from Concordia University and a Master of Science in Renewable Resources from McGill University. He was a member of the Quebec pop group INMOTION in September 2000. This group had some success in the early 2000s and appeared on the Radio-Canada television program La Fureur.

While a student at Concordia in 2002, Peter Schiefke launched the We Will Always Remember (WWAR) project, aimed at raising awareness among youth of the sacrifices made by Canadian soldiers around the world, for which he received the Minister of Veterans Affairs Commendation in 2003. In 2006, he and Awel Uwihanganye founded the Concordia Volunteer Abroad Program (CVAP), now known as Community, Empowerment, Education, Development (CEED). This organization organizes cooperation and development projects in the Gulu region of Uganda.

Peter Schiefke also co-founded Youth Action Montreal in 2006 with Mohamed Shuriye to promote the engagement of Montreal college and university students in sustainable development and environmental protection. In 2007, this organization organized the conference "Less Talk, More Action: A Youth Summit on Climate Change", which was attended by Al Gore and David Suzuki and brought together thousands of people at the Palais des congrès de Montréal. In 2009, he was appointed National Director of The Climate Reality Project Canada Foundation, and after his term was appointed to the Board of Directors.

Political career 
Peter Schiefke ran for the Liberal Party of Canada nomination in Vaudreuil-Soulanges in July 2014, with the federal election coming up the following year. On February 24, 2015, he was chosen as the candidate on the second ballot at a nomination meeting where he was up against two other candidates. On October 19, he was elected with 46.6% of the vote, defeating sitting New Democratic Party MP Jamie Nicholls.

In December 2015 he was appointed Parliamentary Secretary to the Prime Minister for Youth. As Parliamentary Secretary for Youth, he worked closely with the Prime Minister in the creation of the first-ever Prime Minister’s Youth Council, the creation of the first-ever Youth Policy for the Government of Canada, and advocated for increases to student aid, bursaries, and entrepreneurship programs. IIn August 2018, he was asked to take on additional responsibilities and serve as the Parliamentary Secretary to the Minister of Border Security and Organized Crime Reduction, Bill Blair. In this role, he helped lead the implementation of the Cannabis Act, which legalized recreational use of cannabis in Canada on October 17, 2018, and helped lead Canada’s response to the record numbers of asylum seekers and irregular migrants entering Canada through irregular and regular points of entry.

He ran again in the 2019 election and was re-elected with 47.3% of the vote. Prime Minister Justin Trudeau subsequently appointed him the Parliamentary Secretary for Environment and Climate Change in December 2019. During is his time as Parliamentary Secretary, he was asked to take on a leadership role in the Governments efforts to protect 25% of Canada’s Nature by 2025, update and strengthen Canada’s Environmental Protection Act (CEPA) that had not been updated since 1999, and implement a ban on harmful single-use plastics. The ban on harmful single-use plastics was announced by Prime Minister Justin Trudeau on October 7, 2020, and is projected to come into force at the end of 2022. The CEPA legislation, Bill C-28: Strengthening Environmental Protection for a Healthier Canada Act, was tabled in the House of Commons on April 13, 2021, but ultimately died on the order paper when the election was called on August 15 of that same year. The Bill is projected to be re-introduced in the 44th Parliament. In March 2021, he was appointed the Parliamentary Secretary to the Minister of Immigration, Refugees, and Citizenship and served in that capacity until the Federal election was called on August 15 of the same year.

On September 20, 2021 he was elected for a third consecutive term as the Member of Parliament for Vaudreuil-Soulanges, receiving 46.4% of the vote. On December 16, 2021 he was elected the Chair of the House of Commons Standing Committee on Transport, Infrastructure, and Communities.

Electoral record

References

External links

1979 births
Living people
Liberal Party of Canada MPs
Members of the House of Commons of Canada from Quebec
Canadian environmentalists
Canadian pop singers
Concordia University alumni
McGill University alumni
Politicians from Montreal
Singers from Montreal
21st-century Canadian politicians
21st-century Canadian male singers